Stage Struck is a 1958 American drama film directed by Sidney Lumet and starring Henry Fonda, Susan Strasberg and Christopher Plummer in his film debut. The screenplay, by Augustus and Ruth Goetz, is based on the stage play Morning Glory by Zoë Akins, which also served as the basis for the 1933 film Morning Glory starring Katharine Hepburn, Douglas Fairbanks Jr. and Adolphe Menjou in corresponding roles.

Plot 
New Englander Eva Lovelace, an ingenue intent on conquering the Broadway stage, is willing to sacrifice everything, including her love for suave producer Lewis Easton, to achieve her goal. Her trials and tribulations ultimately lead to a moment of triumph when she successfully steps in for temperamental, Tallulah Bankhead-like, leading lady Rita Vernon.

Cast 
 Henry Fonda as Lewis Easton
 Susan Strasberg as Eva Lovelace 
 Christopher Plummer as Joe Sheridan 
 Joan Greenwood as Rita Vernon 
 Herbert Marshall as Robert Harley Hedges 
 Pat Harrington as Benny 
 Frank Campanella as Victor 
 John Fiedler as Adrian
 Jack Weston as Frank

Production 
Filmed entirely on location in New York City, the film was produced by RKO Radio Pictures and distributed by Walt Disney Productions' then new distribution arm Buena Vista Film Distribution Co., Inc. which replaced RKO as Disney's distributor.

Critical reception 
In his review in The New York Times, A.H. Weiler opined, "the moviemakers ... obviously are devoted people, whose emotions, unfortunately, rarely move a viewer ... The fact is that the bare bones of the plot ... do not constitute a great revelation in a sophisticated age ... Susan Strasberg ... is competent as the determined Eva Lovelace. She is petite and fragile and sometimes expressive but strangely pallid in a role that would seem to call for fire, not mere smoldering ... Christopher Plummer ... is restrained but effective. Joan Greenwood ... is explosively emotional ... and Herbert Marshall does well ... It makes a nice show even if it is not stirring."

See also 
 List of American films of 1958

References

External links 
  
 
 Stage Struck at Turner Classic Movies
 

1958 films
1958 romantic drama films
American romantic drama films
Films scored by Alex North
Films about actors
Films about theatre
American films based on plays
Films directed by Sidney Lumet
Films set in New York City
Films shot in New York City
RKO Pictures films
1950s English-language films
1950s American films